Carol Jagger (born December 1951) is professor of the epidemiology of ageing at Newcastle University. Her research relates to the impact of an ageing population on society.

References

External links

Living people
Alumni of the University of Leeds
Alumni of the University of Leicester
Academics of Newcastle University
Academics of the University of Leicester
Fellows of the Faculty of Public Health
Fellows of the Gerontological Society of America
1951 births
British women scientists
Fellows of the Royal Statistical Society